This article is the discography for American born rapper Blood Raw.

Albums

Studio albums

Mixtapes
2010: "The Real American Gangstaz6+

As lead artist

Guest appearances
2006: "Gangsta Shit" (DJ Khaled featuring U.S.D.A. and Bun B)
2006: "Keep It Gangsta" (Young Jeezy featuring Slick Pulla and Blood Raw)
2007: "26 Inches" (Young Buck featuring Blood Raw)
2008: "We Run It" (2 Pistols featuring Slick Pulla and Blood Raw)
2008: "Final Warning"  (DJ Khaled featuring Rock City, Ace Hood, Blood Raw, Bali, Lil Scrappy, Shawty Lo, Brisco, and Bun B)
2008: "My Life" (Chopper City Boyz featuring Blood Raw)
2009: "Stupid Money" (Young Buck featuring Jimmie Hoffa and Blood Raw)
2009: "Something Else (Remix)" (Jadakiss featuring Young Jeezy, Snyp Life, Bully, AP, Boo Rossini & Blood Raw)
2009: "Everybody Do It" (Young Buck featuring Blood Raw and Sosa Tha Plug) off: Back For The Streets

External links
Blood Raw discography on Myspace

Hip hop discographies
Discographies of American artists